Helen Kim (also Kim Hwal-lan, 1899 – 1970) was a South Korean politician, educator, social activist, and feminist.  Her pen name was Wuwol(우월;又月). Kim is the founder of the daily Korean newspaper, The Korea Times.

Biography 
Kim was born in Incheon to a large, modern family. She attended Christian schools as a girl. She attended Ewha Girls School. Between graduating from Ewha, she "established the national YWCA Korea" in 1922. Then she went to Wesleyan College where she earned her bachelor's degree in 1924. Kim went to Boston University for a master's in philosophy (1931) and then received her PhD in education from Columbia University in 1931.

Kim later became dean of a girls' college (Ewha College) in 1931. By the time of her death, this school will have become the largest women's university in the world.

Kim was involved with Kŭnwuhwoe, which was a national women's organization that was dedicated to ending the "remaining Korean feudal practices and beliefs as well as colonial constraints." However, she didn't stay involved for long because she was "unwilling to work with women who were Marxists and socialists."

In 1945, Kim, O Ch'ǒn-sǒk, Yu Ŏk-kyǒm and Paek Nak-chun formed the Korean Committee on Education. This committee worked with the United States in the Education Bureau, making recommendations about schools and their staff.

Kim became director of the Office of Public Information for President Syngman Rhee in 1948. In 1949, she attended the United Nations General Assembly in Boston. As the director of the Office of Public Information, she recommended that an English newspaper was needed. She chose the name of the paper, deciding that The Korea Times was the best name for representing the whole country. The newspaper was published on November 1, 1950.

Controversy 
Kim is a controversial figure because of her involvement in activities that were considered "pro-Japanese" during the Japanese occupation of Korea. As the principal of Ehwa, she used her position to inspire others to encourage the men in their lives to join the military draft for the Japanese army. Kim herself justified her actions as "necessary in order to keep Ewha open under harsh colonial policies" and could also be seen as consistent with Methodist Church teachings (Kim's religion). Kim continues to be an agent of controversy, with her effigy being burned and students protesting her statue.

References

External links 
 Helen Kim (1899–1970) : Columbia University
 김활란:대한민국 학술원 
 Helen Kim
 Helen Kim

1899 births
1970 deaths
Korean collaborators with Imperial Japan
Korean religious leaders
Korean women poets
South Korean Methodists
Korean novelists
Korean fantasy writers
Mythopoeic writers
Korean revolutionaries
Korean writers
Korean educators
Korean scholars
20th-century Korean women
South Korean feminists
South Korean journalists
South Korean women journalists
Korean anti-communists
Teachers College, Columbia University alumni
Ohio Wesleyan University alumni
20th-century Korean poets
20th-century novelists
20th-century women writers
20th-century journalists
Women government ministers of South Korea
Members of the National Academy of Sciences of the Republic of Korea
Presidents of universities and colleges in South Korea